Lee Yi-ting is a Taiwanese politician.

Political career
Both Lee and fellow Kuomintang member Kang Shih-ju planned to run in the January 2008 legislative elections, and the party chose to back Lee. He was elected to the Legislative Yuan in January 2008, defeating Democratic Progressive Party incumbent Tu Wen-ching. A few weeks after the election, the Miaoli District Prosecutors Office charged Lee with vote buying. The Taichung bench of the Taiwan High Court upheld the ruling of the Miaoli District Court in December, annulling Lee's electoral victory. By-elections were scheduled for 14 March 2009, and the Kuomintang named Lee's wife Chen Luan-ing as its candidate. She lost to Kang Shih-ju, a candidate who had left the KMT to plan an independent campaign.

References

Living people
Kuomintang Members of the Legislative Yuan in Taiwan
Members of the 7th Legislative Yuan
Miaoli County Members of the Legislative Yuan
Taiwanese politicians convicted of fraud
Year of birth missing (living people)